The 1998 Visa Sports Car Championships was the tenth and final round the 1998 FIA GT Championship season.  It took place at the Laguna Seca Raceway, California, United States on October 25, 1998.

This race shared the weekend with a Professional SportsCar Racing Championship event.

Official results
Class winners are in bold.  Cars failing to complete 70% of winner's distance are marked as Not Classified (NC).

Statistics
 Pole position – #2 AMG Mercedes – 1:16.154
 Fastest lap – #2 AMG Mercedes – 1:19.094
 Average speed – 158.815 km/h

References

 
 
 

L
Laguna Seca 500
FIA GT Laguna Seca 500km
FIA GT Laguna Seca 500km